Prine is a surname of either English or French (derived from Perrin) origin. Notable people with the surname include:

 Andrew Prine (1936–2022), American actor
 Barney Prine (1841–1919), founder of the city of Prineville, Oregon which was originally named Prine
 Carl Prine (born 1966), military investigative reporter
 John Prine (1946–2020), American singer-songwriter
 Linda Prine, American family physician